Golshanichthys is an extinct monospecific genus of dunkleosteid from the Late Devonian: Frasnian stage from Kerman, Iran.

Phylogeny
Golshanichthys belongs to the family Dunkleosteidae, closely related to the giant Dunkleosteus. The phylogeny of Golshanichthys can be shown in the cladogram below:

Alternatively, the subsequent 2016 Zhu et al. study using a larger morphological dataset recovered Panxiosteidae well outside of Dunkleosteoidea, leaving the status of Dunkleosteidae as a clade grouping separate from Dunkleosteoidea in doubt, as shown in the cladogram below:

References

Arthrodires
Placoderms of Asia